During her many visits to Australia, Queen Elizabeth II opened sessions of parliament and unveiled various buildings, venues and other things. They included, but are not limited to:

Photo gallery

See also
Royal visits to Australia

References

External links
 

Official openings
Elizabeth II, official openings
Official openings